Yacuitella is a monotypic genus of Argentinian jumping spiders containing the single species, Yacuitella nana. It was first described by María Elena Galiano in 1999, and is found in Argentina.

References

Monotypic Salticidae genera
Salticidae
Spiders of Argentina